The Mazarin River is a tributary of the Ashuapmushuan River, flowing into the unorganized territory of Lac-Ashuapmushuan, Quebec, into the Regional County Municipality (MRC) of Le Domaine-du-Roy, in the administrative region of Saguenay-Lac-Saint-Jean, in Quebec, in Canada.

The Mazarin river flows entirely in the canton of Théberge. Forestry is the main economic activity of this valley; recreational tourism activities, second.

The Forest Road R0203 (North-South direction) serves the valley of the Mazarin River, the Hilarion River, the Du Chef River and the Nestaocano River; this road starting south at the junction of route 167 which links Chibougamau to Saint-Félicien, Quebec.

The surface of the Mazarin River is usually frozen from early November to mid-May, however, safe ice circulation is generally from mid-November to mid-April.

Geography

Toponymy 
The toponym "Rivière Mazarin" was officialized on December 5, 1968, at the Commission de toponymie du Québec, when it was created.

Notes and references

See also 

Rivers of Saguenay–Lac-Saint-Jean
Le Domaine-du-Roy Regional County Municipality